GNS may refer to:

Places
 Binaka Airport, in Gunung Sitoli, Nias Island, Indonesia
 Gainesville station (Georgia), an Amtrak station in Georgia, United States

Companies and organizations
 Gesellschaft für Nuklear-Service, a German nuclear-waste services company
 Ghana Nuclear Society, nuclear energy advocacy organization
 Glenlyon Norfolk School in Victoria, British Columbia, Canada
 GNS Healthcare, an American data analytics company
 GNS Science, a New Zealand earth-science research institute
 Gordon-North Sydney Hockey Club, based in Sydney, Australia
 Government of National Salvation, in Serbia during the Second World War
 Gunns, a defunct Australian timber company

Other uses
 Gelfand–Naimark–Segal construction, a theorem in functional analysis
 General News Service, a BBC-internal news-distribution service
 GEOnet Names Server, a database of place names and locations
 Global Namespace, computer networking concept
 GNS theory, in role-playing game design
 GNU Name System, a decentralized name-system
 Grain or grape neutral spirit, highly concentrated and purified ethanol
 Guinea (coin), for guineas, plural form of former British coin and currency unit
 N-acetylglucosamine-6-sulfatase, an enzyme

See also

GN (disambiguation)
GSN (disambiguation)
NGS (disambiguation)
NSG (disambiguation)
SNG (disambiguation)
SGN (disambiguation)